Discoveries is the debut studio album by Australian heavy metal band Northlane. It was released on 11 November 2011 through UNFD. It was produced by Shane Edwards and Dave Petrovic, and recorded at Electric Sun Studios in Arndell Park. It is the only album to feature their second bassist Simon Anderson before he was "fired" from the band.

Background
The cube featured on the album art is a "printed out, and origami folded, edited image from the Hubble Space Telescope".

Promotion
To promote their debut studio album, Northlane performed an 18-date national tour. They performed in Sydney twice, Gold Coast, Brisbane, Nambour, Port Macquarie, Newcastle twice, Dubbo, Central Coast, Werribee, Melbourne twice, Bendigo, Warrnambool, Mount Gambier, Adelaide, and Geelong.

Critical reception

The album received generally favourable reviews. KillYourStereo called it the best Australian album of 2011. Sam Radojcin of Loud, praised the band's unique take on the progressive genre, and claimed they had potential.

Track listing

Notes
 "I Shook Hands with Death" is printed as "Ishookhandswithdeath" on physical releases.

Personnel
Northlane
 Adrian Fitipaldes – lead vocals
 Jon Deiley – lead guitar
 Josh Smith – rhythm guitar
 Simon Anderson – bass
 Nic Pettersen – drums, percussion

Additional personnel
 Shane Edwards – production, engineering
 Dave Petrovic – production, engineering
 Will Putney – mixing, mastering

Chart performance

References

2011 debut albums
Northlane albums
Distort Entertainment albums
UNFD albums